Uperodon palmatus is a species of frog in the family Microhylidae. It is endemic to the central hills of Sri Lanka. Common names Parker's dot frog, Parker's globular frog, and half-webbed pug-snout frog have been coined for it.

Adults occur in leaf-litter (at least partially fossorially), under stones and other ground cover, beneath bark, on the trunks of trees, and in the canopy. It is a rare species. It is threatened by habitat loss caused by the conversion of forests to cultivated land (tea plantations), logging, and droughts and fire (especially in the Horton Plains National Park). It occurs in a number of protected areas.

References

palmatus
Frogs of Sri Lanka
Endemic fauna of Sri Lanka
Taxa named by Hampton Wildman Parker
Amphibians described in 1934
Taxonomy articles created by Polbot